The World Happiness Report is a publication that contains articles and rankings of national happiness, based on respondent ratings of their own lives, which the report also correlates with various (quality of) life factors. As of March 2023, Finland has been ranked the happiest country in the world six times in a row.

The report is a publication of the Sustainable Development Solutions Network, a global initiative of the United Nations. The report primarily uses data from the Gallup World Poll. Each annual report is available to the public to download on the World Happiness Report website. The Editors of the 2020 report are John F. Helliwell, Richard Layard, Jeffrey D. Sachs, and Jan-Emmanuel De Neve. Associate Editors are Lara Aknin, Shun Wang, and Haifang Huang.

History
In July 2011, the UN General Assembly adopted resolution 65/309 Happiness: Towards a Holistic Definition of Development inviting member countries to measure the happiness of their people and to use the data to help guide public policy. On April 2, 2012, this was followed by the first UN High Level Meeting called Wellbeing and Happiness: Defining a New Economic Paradigm, which was chaired by UN Secretary General Ban Ki-moon and Prime Minister Jigmi Thinley of Bhutan, a nation that adopted gross national happiness instead of gross domestic product as their main development indicator.

The first World Happiness Report was released on April 1, 2012 as a foundational text for the UN High Level Meeting: Well-being and Happiness: Defining a New Economic Paradigm, drawing international attention. The first report outlined the state of world happiness, causes of happiness and misery, and policy implications highlighted by case studies. In 2013, the second World Happiness Report was issued, and in 2015 the third. Since 2016, it has been issued on an annual basis on the 20th of March, to coincide with the UN's International Day of Happiness.

Methods and philosophy
The rankings of national happiness are based on a Cantril ladder survey undertaken world-wide by the polling company Gallup, Inc. Nationally representative samples of respondents are asked to think of a ladder, with the best possible life for them being a 10, and the worst possible life being a 0. They are then asked to rate their own current lives on that 0 to 10 scale. The report correlates the life evaluation results with various life factors.

The life factor variables used in the reports are reflective of determinants that explain national-level differences in life evaluations across research literature. However, certain variables, such as unemployment or inequality, are not considered as comparable data is not yet available across all countries. The variables used illustrate important correlations rather than causal estimates.

The use of subjective measurements of wellbeing is meant to be a bottom-up approach which emancipates respondents to evaluate their own wellbeing. In this context, the value of the Cantril Ladder is the fact that a respondent can self-anchor themselves based on their perspective.

In the reports, experts in fields including economics, psychology, survey analysis, and national statistics, describe how measurements of well-being can be used effectively to assess the progress of nations, and other topics. Each report is organized by chapters that delve deeper into issues relating to happiness, including mental illness, the objective benefits of happiness, the importance of ethics, policy implications, and links with the Organisation for Economic Co-operation and Development's (OECD) approach to measuring subjective well-being and other international and national efforts.

WELLBYs

From 2021 the World Happiness Report has advocated for the use of WELLBYs (Well-Being-Adjusted Life-Years); it argues that QALYs only count the individual patient's health-related quality of life, and instead WELLBYs should be used. Policy-makers should aim to maximise the WELLBYs of all who are born, and also include the WELLBYs of future generations (subject to a small discount rate).

Annual report topics
World Happiness Reports were issued in 2012, 2013, 2015, 2016 (an update), 2017, 2018, 2019, 2020, 2021 and 2023. 

In addition to ranking countries happiness and well-being levels, each report has contributing authors and most focus on a particular theme. The data used to rank countries in each report is drawn from the Gallup World Poll, as well as other sources such as the World Values Survey, in some of the reports. The Gallup World Poll questionnaire measures 14 areas within its core questions: (1) business & economic, (2) citizen engagement, (3) communications & technology, (4) diversity (social issues), (5) education & families, (6) emotions (well-being), (7) environment & energy, (8) food & shelter, (9) government and politics, (10) law & order (safety), (11) health, (12) religion & ethics, (13) transportation, and (14) work.

2023 World Happiness Report 

The 2023 World Happiness Report was a triannual analysis of 2020-2022, heavily influenced by COVID19 and other significant challenges.

For the 6th consecutive year, Finland was ranked on top, followed by Denmark, Iceland, Israel and the Netherlands. In the top-10 rankings Israel jumped 5 places, while Switzerland fell 4 places.

2022 World Happiness Report 

The 2022 World Happiness Report included a section looking at possible genetic effects on individual happiness. 

Finland is in the top position in the world happiness report in 2022. Followed by Denmark and Iceland in second and third place. Switzerland,  Netherlands, Luxembourg, Sweden, Norway, Israel and New Zealand, were among the top 10 'happiest' countries in the world .

Among 146 countries ranked by the report, Afghanistan scores the lowest point of 2.523 and was ranked as the least 'happy' country in the world in 2022.

2021 World Happiness Report 

The 2021 World Happiness Report, released on March 20, 2021, ranks 156 countries based on an average of three years of surveys between 2017 and 2019. The 2020 report especially focuses on the environment – social, urban, and natural, and includes links between happiness and sustainable development.

Finland holds the rank of the happiest country in the world for the fourth consecutive year. It is followed by Denmark, Switzerland, Iceland and Netherlands. Afghanistan received the lowest score, with South Sudan and Rwanda just above it. In addition to country rankings, this is the second year that the World Happiness Report ranks cities. The happiest city in the world is Helsinki, the capital of Finland. The report shows that the happiness ranking of cities is almost identical to that of the countries they are in.

2020 World Happiness Report 

The 2020 World Happiness Report, released on March 20, 2020, ranks 156 countries based on an average of three years of surveys between 2017 and 2019. The 2020 report especially focuses on the environment – social, urban, and natural, and includes links between happiness and sustainable development.

Finland holds the rank of the happiest country in the world for the third consecutive year. It is followed by Denmark, Switzerland, Iceland and Norway. Afghanistan received the lowest score, with South Sudan and Zimbabwe just above it. In addition to country rankings, this is the first year that the World Happiness Report ranks cities. The happiest city in the world is Helsinki, the capital of Finland. The report shows that the happiness ranking of cities is almost identical to that of the countries they are in.

In 2020, the editorial team expanded and Jan-Emmanuel De Neve became a co-editor, joining John F. Helliwell, Richard Layard, Jeffrey D. Sachs, and the Oxford Wellbeing Research Centre became a fourth research pillar for the report. Associate editors were Lara Aknin, Haifang Huang and Shun Wang, and Sharon Paculor was recognized as production editor. From 2020, Gallup became a full data partner.

2019 World Happiness Report 

The 2019 World Happiness Report focuses community. According to the 2019 Happiness Report, Finland is the happiest country in the world, with Denmark, Norway, Iceland, and The Netherlands holding the next top positions.

The second chapter of the report, 'Changing World Happiness', measures year-to-year changes in happiness across countries. For this, changes are reported from 2005-2008 to 2016-2018. Of the 132 countries with data for 2005-2008 and 2016-2018, 106 had significant changes: 64 were significant increases and 42 were significant decreases. Benin was the top gainer, while Venezuela showed the greatest decrease. The chapter also considers how happiness has been affected by changes in the quality of government. The third chapter considers happiness and voting behaviour, with data suggesting that happier people are more likely to vote, and to vote for incumbents.

The fourth chapter is an examination of happiness and pro-social behaviour, finding that people are more likely to derive happiness from helping others when they feel free to choose whether or how to help, when they feel connected to the people they are helping, and when they can see how their help is making a difference.

The final topic of the report, digital and information technologies and happiness, is covered in the remaining chapters.

The editorial team for the 2019 report was expanded to include Lara Aknin as associate editor.

2018 World Happiness Report 

The 2018 iteration was released on 20 March and focused on the relation between happiness and migration.

2017 World Happiness Report 

The fifth World Happiness Report emphasizes the importance of the social foundations of happiness, which are analysed by comparing the life experiences between the top and bottom ten countries in the year’s happiness rankings. Norway topped the global happiness rankings in this report, jumping from fourth place in 2016 to first in 2017. It was followed by Denmark, Iceland and Switzerland. The second chapter of the report focuses on the global rankings and calculates that bringing the social foundations from the lowest levels up to world average levels in 2014-2016 would increase life evaluations by almost two points. This means that social foundations effects are together larger than those of GDP per capita and healthy life expectancy.

The third chapter focuses on economic growth and wellbeing in China, and shows that unemployment and changes in the social safety nets explain both the post-1990 fall in happiness levels and the subsequent recovery since 2005. The fourth chapter discusses the reasons why countries in Africa are generally lagging behind others in life evaluations. The fifth chapter analyses key determinants of happiness, including income, mental health, and physical health. The sixth chapter considers the determinant of employment and work in particular, emphasising the importance of employment for happiness across the world. The final chapter uses happiness history over the past ten years, analysing the case of the United States through the lens of social foundations of happiness.

2016 World Happiness Report 

The 2016 World Happiness Report -Rome Addition was issued in two parts as an update. Part one had four chapters: (1) Setting the Stage, (2) The Distribution of World Happiness, (3) Promoting Secular Ethics, and (4) Happiness and Sustainable Development: Concepts and Evidence. Part two has six chapters: (1) Inside the Life Satisfaction Blackbox, (2) Human Flourishing, the Common Good, and Catholic Social Teaching, (3) The Challenges of Public Happiness: An Historical-Methodological Reconstruction, (4) The Geography of Parenthood and Well-Being: Do Children Make Us Happy, Where and Why?, and (5) Multidimensional Well-Being in Contemporary Europe: An Analysis of the Use of a Self-Organizing Map Applied to Share Data.

Chapter 1, Setting the Stage is written by John F. Helliwell, Richard Layard, and Jeffrey Sachs. This chapter briefly surveys the happiness movement ("Increasingly, happiness is considered to be the proper measure of social progress and the goal of public policy.") gives an overview of the 2016 reports and synopsis of both parts of the 2016 Update Rome Addition.

Chapter 2, The Distribution of World Happiness is written by John F. Helliwell, Hailing Huang, and Shun Wang. This chapter reports happiness levels of countries and proposes the use of inequalities of happiness among individuals as a better measure for inequality than income inequality, and that all people in a population fare better in terms of happiness when there is less inequality in happiness in their region. It includes data from the World Health Organization and World Development Indicators, as well as Gallup World Poll. It debunks the notion that people rapidly adapt to changes in life circumstances and quickly return to an initial life satisfaction baseline, finding instead that changes in life circumstances such as government policies, major life events (unemployment, major disability) and immigration change people's baseline life satisfaction levels. This chapter also addresses the measure for affect (feelings), finding that positive affect (happiness, laughter, enjoyment) has much "large and highly significant impact" on life satisfaction than negative affect (worry, sadness, anger). The chapter also examines differences in happiness levels explained by the factors of (1) social support, (2) income, (3) healthy life, (4) trust in government and business, (5) perceived freedom to make life decisions and (6) generosity.

Chapter 3, Promoting Secular Ethics is written by Richard Layard, This chapter argues for a revival of an ethical life and world, harkening to times when religious organizations were a dominant force. It calls on secular non-profit organizations to promote "ethical living in a way that provides inspiration, uplift, joy and mutual respect", and gives examples of implementation by a non-profit founded by Richard Layard, the chapter author, Action for Happiness, which offers online information from positive psychology and Buddhist teachings.

Chapter 4, Happiness and Sustainable Development: Concepts and Evidence is written by Jeffrey Sachs. This chapter identifies ways that sustainable development indicators (economic, social and environmental factors) can be used to explain variations in happiness. It concludes with a report about an appeal to include subjective well-being indicators into the UN Sustainable Development Goals (SDGs).

Part Two 2016 Special Rome Edition was edited by Jeffrey Sacks, Leonardo Becchetti and Anthony Arnett.

Chapter 1, Inside the Life Satisfaction Blackbox is written by Leonardo Becchetti, Luisa Carrado, and Paolo Sama. This chapter proposes using quality of life measurements (a broader range of variables that life evaluation) in lieu of or in addition to overall life evaluations in future World Happiness Reports.

Chapter 2, Human Flourishing, the Common Good, and Catholic Social Teaching is written by Anthony Annett. This chapter contains explanations for three theories: (1) It is human nature to broadly define happiness and understand the connection between happiness and the common good, (2) that the current understanding of individuality is stripped of ties to the common good, and (3) that there is a need to restore the common good as central value for society. The chapter also proposes Catholic school teachings as a model for restoring the common good as a dominant value.

Chapter 3, The Challenges of Public Happiness: An Historical-Methodological Reconstruction is written by Luigino Bruni and Stefano Zemagni. This chapter contemplates Aristotelian concepts of happiness and virtue as they pertain to and support the findings in the World Happiness Reports regarding the impact of social support, trust in government, and equality of happiness.

Chapter 4, The Geography of Parenthood and Well-Being. Do Children Make Us Happy, Where and Why? is written by Luca Stanca. This chapter examines other research findings that children do not add happiness to parents. Using data from the World Values Survey, it finds that, with the exception of widowed parents, having children has a negative effect on life satisfaction for parents in 2/3 of the 105 countries studied, with parents in richer countries suffering more. Once parents are old, life satisfaction increases. The chapter concludes that "existing evidence is not conclusive" and a statement that the causes for the low life satisfaction levels may be that for richer countries, having children is valued less, and in poorer countries, people suffer in financial and time costs when they have children.

Chapter 5, Multidimensional Well-Being in Contemporary Europe: Analysis of the Use of Self-Organizing Map Allied to SHARE Data is written by Mario Lucchini, Luca Crivelli and Sara della Bella. This chapter contains a study of well-being data from older European adults. It finds that this chapter's study results were consistent with the World Happiness Report 2016 update: positive affect (feelings) have a stronger impact on a person's satisfaction with life than do negative affect (feelings).

2015 World Happiness Report 

The 2015 World Happiness Report has eight chapters: (1) Setting the Stage, (2) The Geography of World Happiness, (3) How Does Subjective Well-being Vary Around the World by Gender and Age?, (4) How to Make Policy When Happiness is the Goal, (5) Neuroscience of Happiness, (6) Healthy Young Minds Transforming the Mental Health of Children, (7) Human Values, Civil Economy, and Subjective Well-being, and (8) Investing in Social Capital.

Chapter 1, Setting the Stage is written by John F. Helliwell, Richard Layard and Jeffrey Sachs. This chapter celebrates the success of the happiness movement ("Happiness is increasingly considered a proper means of social progress and public policy."), citing the OECD Guidelines on Measuring Subjective Well-being, a referendum in the EU requiring member nations to measure happiness, and the success of the World Happiness reports (with readership at about 1.5 million), and the adoption of happiness by the government of the United Arab Emirates, and other areas. It sets an aspiration of the inclusion of subjective well-being into the 2015 Sustainable Development Goals (not fulfilled), and outlines the 2015 report. It also address the use of the term Happiness, identifying the cons (narrowness of the term, breath of the term, flakiness), and defining the use of the term for the reasons that the 2011 UN General Assembly Resolution 65/309 Happiness Towards A Holistic Approach to Development and April 2012 UN High Level Meeting: Well-being and Happiness: Defining a New Economic Paradigm, Bhutan's Gross National Happiness philosophy, the term's "convening and attention attracting power", and the asset in a "double usage of happiness" as an emotional report and life evaluation.

Chapter 2, The Geography of Happiness is written by John F. Helliwell, Hailing Huang and Shun Wang. This chapter reports the happiness of nations measured by life evaluations. It includes color coded maps and an analysis of six factors the account for the differences: (1) social support in terms of someone to count on in times of need, (2) GDP per capita (income), (3) life expectancy (in terms of healthy years), (4) sense of corruption in government and business (trust), (5) perceived freedom to make life decisions, and (6) generosity. The first three factors were found to have the biggest impact on a population's happiness. Crisis (natural disasters and economic crisis) the quality of governance, and social support were found to be the key drivers for changes in national happiness levels, with the happiness of nations undergoing a crisis in which people have a strong sense of social support falling less than nations where people do not have a strong sense of social support.

Chapter 3, How Does Subjective Well-being Vary Around the Globe by Gender and Age? is written by Nicole Fortin, John F. Helliwell and Shun Wang. This chapter uses data for 12 experiences: happiness (the emotion), smiling or laughing, enjoyment, feeling safe at night, feeling well rested, and feeling interested, as well as anger, worry, sadness, depression, stress and pain to examine differences by gender and age. Findings reported include that there is not a lot of difference in life evaluations between men and women across nations or within ages in a nation (women have slightly higher life evaluations than men: 0.09 on a ten-point scale). It reports that overall happiness falls into a U shape with age on the x axis and happiness on the y, with the low point being middle age (45-50) for most nations (in some happiness does not go up much in later life, so the shape is more of a downhill slide), and that the U shape holds for feeling well rested in all regions. It finds that men generally feel safer at night than women but, when comparing countries, people in Latin America have the lowest sense of safety at night, while people in East Asia and Western Europe have the highest sense of safety at night. It also finds that as women age their sense of happiness declines and stress increases but worry decreases, as all people age their laughter, enjoyment and finding something of interest also declines, that anger is felt everywhere almost equally by men and women, stress peaks in the Middle Ages, and women experience depression more than men. It finds that where older people are happier, there is a sense of social support, freedom to make life choices and generosity (and income does not factor in as heavily as these three factors).

Chapter 4, How to Make Policy When Happiness is the Goal is written by Richard Layard and Gus O'Donnell. This chapter advocates for a "new form of cost-benefit analysis" for government expenditures in which a "critical level of extra happiness" yielded by a project is established. It contemplates the prioritization of increasing happiness of the happy vs. reducing misery of the miserable, as well as the issues of discount rate (weight) for the happiness of future generations. It includes a technical annex with equations for calculating the maximization for happiness in public expenditure, tax policy, regulations, the distribution of happiness and a discount rate.

Chapter 5, Neuroscience of Happiness is written by Richard J. Dawson and Brianna S. Schuyler. This chapter reports on research in brain science and happiness, identifying four aspects that account for happiness: (1) sustained positive emotion, (2) recovery of negative emotion (resilience), (3) empathy, altruism and pro-social behavior, and (4) mindfulness (mind-wandering/affective sickness). It concludes that the brain's elasticity indicates that one can change one's sense of happiness and life satisfaction (separate but overlapping positive consequences) levels by experiencing and practicing mindfulness, kindness, and generosity; and calls for more research on these topics.

Chapter 6, Healthy Young Minds: Transforming the Mental Health of Children is written by Richard Layard and Ann Hagell. This chapter identifies emotional development as of primary importance, (compared to academic and behavioral factors) in a child's development and determination of whether a child will be a happy and well-functioning adult. It then focuses on the issue of mental illness in children, citing the statistic that while worldwide 10% of the world's children (approximately 200 million) suffer from diagnosable mental health problems, even in the richest nations, only one quarter of these children of them are in treatment. It identifies the action steps to treating children with mental health problems: local community-lead child well-being programs, training health care professions to identify mental health problems in children, parity of esteem for mental and physical problems and treatment, access to evidence-based mental health treatment for families and children, promotion of well-being in schools with well-being codes that inform the organizational behavior of schools, training teachers to identify mental health in children, teachings of life skills, measuring of children's well-being by schools, development of free apps available internationally to treat mental illness in teens, and inclusion of mental health with the goal of physical health in the Sustainable Development goals. The chapter lists the benefits of treating children's mental health: improved educational performance, reduction in youth crimes, improved earnings and employment in adulthood, and better parenting of the next generation.

Chapter 7, Human Values, Civil Economy and Subjective Well-being is written by Leonardo Bechhetti, Luigino Bruni and Stefano Zamagni. This chapter begins with a critique of the field of economics ("Economics today looks like physics before the discovery of electrons"), identifying reductionism in which humans are conceived of as 100% self-interested individuals (economic reductionism), profit maximization is prioritized over all other interests (corporate reductionism), and societal values are narrowly identified with GDP and ignore environmental, cultural, spiritual and relational aspects (value reductionism). The chapter them focuses on a theoretical approach termed "Civil Economy paradigm", and research about it demonstrating that going beyond reductionism leads to greater socialization for people and communities, and a rise in priority of the values of reciprocity, friendship, trustworthiness, and benevolence. It makes the argument that positive social relationships (trust, benevolence, shared social identities) yield happiness and positive economic outcomes. It ends with recommendations for move from the dominant model of elite-competitive democracy to a participatory/deliberative model of democracy with bottom-up political and economic participation and incentives for non-selfish actions (altruistic people) and corporations with wider goals than pure profit (ethical and environmentally responsible corporations).

Chapter 8, Investing in Social Capital is written by Jeffrey Sachs. This chapter focuses on "pro-sociality" ("individuals making decisions for the common good that may conflict with short-run egoistic incentives"). It identifies pro-social behaviors: honesty, benevolence, cooperation and trustworthiness. It recommends investment in social capital through education, moral instruction, professional codes of conduct, public censure and condemnation of violators of public trust, and public policies to narrow income inequalities for countries where there is generalized distrust of government and business, pervasive corruption and lawless behavior (such as tax evasion).

2013 World Happiness Report 

The 2013 World Happiness Report has eight chapters: (1) Introduction, (2) World Happiness: Trends, Explanations and Distribution, (3) Mental Illness and Unhappiness, (4) The Objective Benefits of Subjective Well-being, (5) Restoring Virtue Ethics in the Quest for Happiness, (6) Using Well-being as a Guide to Policy, (7) The OECD Approach to Measuring Subjective Well-being, and (8) From Capabilities to Contentment: Testing the Links between Human Development and Life Satisfaction.

Chapter 1, Introduction is written by John F. Helliwell, Richard Layard and Jeffrey Sachs. It synopsizes the chapters and gives a discussion of the term happiness.

Chapter 2, World Happiness: Trends, Explanations and Distributions is written by John F. Helliwell and Shun Wang. It provides ratings among countries and regions for satisfaction with life using the Cantril Ladder, positive and negative affect (emotions), and log of GDP per capita, years of healthy life expectancy, having someone to count on in times of trouble, perceptions of corruption, prevalence of generosity, and freedom to make life choices.

Chapter 3, Mental Illness and Unhappiness is written by Richard Layard, Dan Chisholm, Vikram Patel, and Shekhar Saxel. It identifies the far ranging prevalence of mental illness around the world (10% of the world's population at one time) and provides the evidence showing that "mental illness is a highly influential - and...the single biggest - determinant of misery". It concludes with examples of interventions implemented by countries around the world.

Chapter 4, The Objective Benefits of Subjective Well-being is written by Jan-Emmanuel de Neve, Ed Diener, Louis Tay and Cody Xuereb. It provides an explanation of the benefits of subjective well-being (happiness) on health & longevity, income, productivity & organizational behavior, and individual & social behavior. It touches on the role of happiness in human evolution through rewarding behaviors that increase evolutionary success and beneficial to survival.

Chapter 5, Restoring Virtue Ethics in the Quest for Happiness is written by Jeffrey Sachs. It argues that "a renewed focus on the role of ethics, and in particular of virtuous behavior, in happiness could lead us to new and effective strategies for raising individual, national and global well-being", looking to the eightfold noble path (the teachings of the dharma handed down in the Buddhist tradition that encompass wise view/understanding, wise intention, wise speech, wise action, wise livelihood, and effort, concentration and mindfulness), Aristotelian philosophy (people are social animals, "with individual happiness secured only within a political community...[which] should organize its institutions to promote virtuous behavior), and Christian doctrine of St. Thomas Aquinas ("placing happiness in the context of servicing God's will"). It gives an explanation of the evolution of the field of economics up t the "failures of hyper-commercialism" and suggests an antidote based on four global ethical values: (1) non-violence and respect for life, (2) justice and solidarity, (3) honesty and tolerance, and (4) mutual esteem and partnership.

Chapter 6, Using Well-being as Guide to Public Policy is written by Gus O'Donnell. This chapter gives a status report on the issues governments grapple with in adopting well-being and happiness measures and goals for policy, from understanding the data or establishing whether a specific policy improves well-being, to figuring out how to "incorporate well-being into standard policy making". It provides examples of efforts to measure happiness and well-being from Bhutan, New Zealand, South Africa, the UK, and cities and communities in the US, Canada, Australia and Tasmania. It identifies the key policy areas of health, transport and education for policy makers to focus on and includes discussions about interpersonal comparability (concentrating on "getting people out of misery" instead of making happy people happier), discount rate (do we invest more in happiness for people today or in the future?) and putting a monetary value on happiness for policy trade off decisions (e.g. If "a 10% reduction in noise increase SWB by one unit, then we can infer that a 10% reduction is "worth" $1,000" when $1,000 would increase a person's SWB by one unit).

Chapter 7, The OECD Approach to Measuring Subjective Well-being is written by Martine Durand and Conal Smith. This chapter was written the same year the OECD issued its Guidelines on Measuring Subjective Well-being, and is a synopsis of such. It includes a definition for subjective well-being: life evaluation (a person's reflection on their life and life circumstances), affect (positive and negative emotions) and eudaimonia; core measures, a discussion on data collection processes, survey and sample design, other aspects of using subjective well-being metrics, and ideas on how policy-makers can use subjective well-being data. It surveys the status of wealthy countries subjective well-being data collection process, and identifies future directions of experimentation and better income measures, citing the Easterlin Paradox as the basis for this call.

Chapter 8, From Capabilities to Contentment: Testing the Links between Human Development and Life Satisfaction is written by Jon Hall. This chapter explains the components of human development using objective metrics: (1) education, health and command over income and nutrition resources, (2) participation and freedom, (3) human security, (4) equity, and (5) sustainability; key findings of the Human Development Index (HDI) ("weak relationship between economic growth and changes in health and education" as well as life expectancy), and examines the relationship between the HDI and happiness, finding that (1) components of the HDI "correlate strongly with better life evaluations", and (2) there is a strong relationship between life evaluation and the "non-income HDI". It contemplates measurement of conditions of life beyond the HDI that are important to well-being: (1) better working conditions, (2) security against crime and physical violence, (3) participation in economic and political activities, (4) freedom and (5) inequality. The concludes with the statements that the HDI and SWB have similar approaches and importantly connected, with the two disciplines offering alternative and complementary views of development.

2012 World Happiness Report 

The 2012 World Happiness Report was issued at the UN High Level Meeting Well-being and Happiness: Defining a New Economic Paradigm by editors John F. Helliwell, Richard Layard and Jeffrey Sachs. Part one has an introduction (chapter 1) and three chapters: (2) the State of World Happiness, (3) Causes of Happiness and Misery, Some Policy Implications. Part two has three chapters, each a case study, of Bhutan, the United Kingdom Office of National Statistics, and the OECD.

Chapter 1, The Introduction is by Jeffrey Sachs and references Buddha and Aristotle, identifies today's era as the anthropocene, and identifies the reasons GDP is not a sufficient measure to guide governments and society.

Chapter 2, The State of World Happiness, is written by John F. Helliwell and Shun Wang, and contains a discussion of subjective well-being measures that ranges from the validity of subjective well-being measures to the seriousness of happiness, happiness set points and cultural comparisons, and it includes data from the Gallup World Poll, European Social Survey, and the World Values Survey.

Chapter 3, The Causes of Happiness and Misery is written by Richard Layard, Andrew Clark, and Claudia Senik, and contemplates research on the impact on happiness of the external factors of income, work, community and governance, values and religion, as well as the internal factors of mental health, physical health, family experience, education, and gender and age.

Chapter 4, Some Policy Implications, written by John F. Helliwell, Richard Layard and Jeffrey Sachs, calls for a greater understanding on how governments can measure happiness, the determinants of happiness, and use of happiness data and findings about determinants for policy purposes. It also highlights the role of GDP ("GDP is important but not all that is important") as a guide to policy makers, the importance that policy makers should place on providing opportunities for employment; the role of happiness in policy making ("Making happiness an objective of governments would not therefore lead to the "servile society", and indeed quite the contrary...Happiness comes from an opportunity to mold one's own future, and thus depends on a robust level of freedom."); the role of values and religion ("In well-functioning societies there is widespread support for the universal value that we should treat others as we would like them to treat us. We need to cultivate social norms so that the rich and powerful are never given a feeling of impunity vis-à-vis the rest of society."); calls for wider access to psychological therapies in a section on mental health citing the fact that one third of all families are affected by mental illness; identifies improvements in physical health as "probably the single most important factor that has improved human happiness" and calls out the rich-poor gap in health care between rich and poor countries; calls on workplace and governmental policies that encourage work–life balance and reduce stress, including family support and child care; and states that "Universal access to education is widely judged to be a basic human right..." The chapter concludes with a philosophical discussion.

Chapter 5, Case Study: Bhutan Gross National Happiness and the GNH Index is written by Karma Ura, Sabine Alkire, and Tsoki Zangmo. It gives a short history of the development of the Gross National Happiness (GNH) concept in Bhutan, and an explanation of the GNH index, data collection and data analysis process, including the rating methodology to determine if an individual experiences happiness sufficiency levels, as well as the policy and lifestyle implications

Chapter 6, Case Study: ONS Measuring Subjective Well-being: The UK Office of National Statistics Experience is written by Stephen Hicks. It covers the basis for the creation of the Measuring National Well-being Programme in the UK's Office of National Statistics (ONS), and the development of their methodology for measuring well-being.

Chapter 5, Case Study OECD Guidelines on Measuring Subjective Well-being is an explanation about the process and rationale the OECD was undertaking to develop its Guidelines on Measuring Subjective Well-being, which it issued in 2013.

International rankings 
Data is collected from people in over 150 countries. Each variable measured reveals a populated-weighted average score on a scale running from 0 to 10 that is tracked over time and compared against other countries. These variables currently include:

 real GDP per capita
 social support
 healthy life expectancy
 freedom to make life choices
 generosity
 perceptions of corruption

Each country is also compared against a hypothetical nation called Dystopia. Dystopia represents the lowest national averages for each key variable and is, along with residual error, used as a regression benchmark. The six metrics are used to explain the estimated extent to which each of these factors contribute to increasing life satisfaction when compared to the hypothetical nation of Dystopia, but they themselves do not have an effect on the total score reported for each country.

2023 report

2022 report

2020 report 
The 2020 report features the happiness score averaged over the years 2017–2019. Finland is the 'happiest' country in the world, followed by Denmark, Switzerland, Iceland, and Norway. The data comes from the Gallup World Poll, based entirely on survey scores and answers to the main life evaluation question asked in the poll.

2019 report 
The 2019 report features the happiness score averaged over the years 2016–2018. As per the 2019 Happiness Index, Finland is the 'happiest' country in the world. Denmark, Norway, Iceland and Netherlands hold the next top positions. The report was published on 20 March 2019 by UN. The full report can be read at 2019 Report. The World Happiness Report is a landmark survey of the state of global happiness.

2018 report
The 2018 report features the happiness score averaged over the years 2015–2017. As per the 2018 Happiness Index, Finland is the 'happiest' country in the world. Norway, Denmark, Iceland and Switzerland hold the next top positions. The report was published on 14 March 2018 by UN. The full report can be read at 2018 Report. The World Happiness Report is a landmark survey of the state of global happiness. The World Happiness Report 2018, which ranks 156 countries by their happiness levels, and 117 countries by the happiness of their immigrants, was released on March 14 at a launch event at the Pontifical Academy of Sciences in the Vatican.

2017 report
The 2017 report features the happiness score averaged over the years 2014–2016. For that timespan, Norway was the overall 'happiest' country in the world, even though oil prices had dropped. Close behind were Denmark, Iceland and Switzerland in a tight pack. Four of the top five countries follow the Nordic model. All the top ten countries had high scores in the six categories. The ranked follow-on countries in the top ten are: Finland, the Netherlands, Canada, New Zealand, Australia, and Sweden.

Table of data for 2017:

2016 report

Legend:

2013 report

Criticism

Metrics

Critics have pointed out the difference between evaluations and experiences of wellbeing.  For instance Colombia came 37th in the 2018 World Happiness Report rankings but first by daily emotional experience in Gallup's Positive Experience Index. The inconsistencies in the results of different happiness measurement surveys have also been noted, for instance, a Pew survey of 43 countries in 2014 (which excluded most of Europe) had Mexico, Israel and Venezuela finishing first, second and third. Others point out that the variables of interest used by the World Happiness Report are more appropriate for measuring national-level rather than individual-level happiness.

Methodology

The World Happiness Report's use of a single item indicator measure of subjective well-being is fundamentally different from more traditional Index approaches which use a range of indicators such as the United Nations' Human Development Index, the OECD Better Life Index of 2011, or the Social Progress Index of 2013. There has also been an on-going debate regarding single-item and multi-item scales as measures of life satisfaction.

The idea that subjective well-being can be captured by a survey has also been contested by economists, who have identified that people’s assessments of their happiness can be affected by the way in which, for example, their country’s education system grades exams, and that survey questions on subjective wellbeing are affected by response styles.

See also 

 Bhutan GNH Index
 Broad measures of economic progress
 Disability-adjusted life year
 Economics
 Green national product
 Gender-related Development Index
 Genuine Progress Indicator
 Gross National Happiness
 Happiness economics
 Happy Planet Index
 Human Development Index
 International Happiness Day
 Legatum Prosperity Index
 Leisure satisfaction
 Money-rich, time-poor
 OECD Better Life Index
 Post-materialism
 Progressive utilization theory
 Psychometrics
 Subjective life satisfaction
 Where-to-be-born Index
 Wikiprogress
 World Values Survey
 WIN/GIA

Notes

References

External links
 
 Sustainable Development Solutions Network
 The Guardian
 Interactive map of countries by happiness score as well as GDP, life expectancy, generosity, social support, freedom, and corruption

Happiness indices
Sustainability metrics and indices